The 1992 World Junior Ice Hockey Championships (1992 WJHC) was the 16th edition of the Ice Hockey World Junior Championship and was held from December 26, 1991, until January 4, 1992.  It was held in Füssen and Kaufbeuren, Germany.  The Commonwealth of Independent States won gold, while Sweden won silver, and the United States took home the bronze medal.

Final standings
The 1992 tournament was a round-robin format, with the top three teams winning gold, silver and bronze medals respectively.

The day the tournament began, the Soviet Union formally dissolved. In the week that followed the team continued to play as the Soviet Union, but on January 1, 1992, the team was renamed the Commonwealth of Independent States.  However, three players on the team, Sergejs Žoltoks and Sandis Ozoliņš (from Latvia) and Darius Kasparaitis (from Lithuania) were from nations not part of the Commonwealth.

Switzerland was relegated to Pool B for 1993.

Results

Scoring leaders

Tournament awards

Pool B
Eight teams contested the second tier this year in Tychy and Oswiecim Poland from December 27 to January 5.  It was played in a simple round robin format, each team playing seven games.  This tournament offered a rather improbable result; four of the eight teams finished tied for first.
Standings

Japan was promoted to Pool A and North Korea was relegated to Pool C for 1993.

Pool C
Pool C was contested by nine teams from December 28, to January 4, in Marino and Rome Italy.  In the first round the nine teams were divided into three groups of three.  The second round pitted the three first place teams against each other, likewise for the second place teams.  Greece was disqualified for using an ineligible player, so they did not participate in the final round.

Preliminary round
Group A

Group B

Group C

Final Round
Promotion Group
Group A

Italy was promoted to Pool B for 1993.
Fourth Place Group
Group A

Seventh Place
 1 - 1

References

 
1992 World Junior Hockey Championships at TSN
1992 Championnats du monde de 20 ans at Passionhockey.com

World Junior Ice Hockey Championships
World Junior Ice Hockey Championships
Ice hockey in Bavaria
Sports competitions in Bavaria
1990s in Bavaria
International ice hockey competitions hosted by Germany
World Junior Ice Hockey Championships
World Junior Ice Hockey Championships
Sport in Tychy
Sport in Oświęcim
1991–92 in Polish ice hockey
International ice hockey competitions hosted by Poland
International ice hockey competitions hosted by Italy
1991–92 in Italian ice hockey
1990s in Rome
Sports competitions in Rome